iMeet was a cloud-based video conferencing platform built in HTML 5 and Adobe Flash. iMeet allows up to 125 participants to communicate using traditional landline audio or VoIP audio and to video conference through webcams. iMeet was launched in general release in January 2011. End of product lifecycle 1 April 2019.

Features 

iMeet is browser-based, supporting Internet Explorer 7.0 and newer, Mozilla Firefox 4 and newer, Google Chrome 11 and newer, and Safari 5 and newer. Native iMeet apps are available for the iPhone, the iPad and for Android smartphones. Many Android tablets can access iMeet through their web browser interface.

Additional features  include:
 Persistent meeting room URL
 Up to 125 participants
 Traditional or VoIP audio
 HD quality webcam video through H.264 encoding 
 File storage
 File sharing
 Screen sharing
 Pass control on screen share and file sharing
 Support of HD audio using G.722
 Meeting minutes
 Cloud Controls, an admin console that lets businesses provision and manage large numbers of accounts 
 Public and private chat
 Note taking integrated with Evernote 
 Customizable meeting room backgrounds
 Freely changeable profile pictures
 Integration with Facebook, Twitter, LinkedIn, YouTube and Flickr

Global Partners 

In March 2012, PGi announced a strategic alliance with Deutsche Telekom, positioning Deutsche Telekom as the exclusive reseller of iMeet in Germany.  In July 2012, Deutsche Telekom launched its Business Marketplace with iMeet as a featured product.

In April 2012 PGi announced a strategic alliance with Irish telecommunications provider eircom to offer its video, web, and audio conferencing solutions, including iMeet and GlobalMeet, to its business customers in Ireland.

In April 2013 PGi announced a strategic alliance with TeliaSonera in the Nordic and Baltic countries. In June 2014 Telia in Sweden launched iMeet

Awards and recognition
 April 2012 - Awarded silver in the Best New Product category of the Edison Awards. 
 February 2012 – PGi awarded Frost & Sullivan’s 2011 Product Line Strategy Award, which includes iMeet. 
 November 2011 - Named the gold winner in the Best New Product category of the Best in Biz Awards. 
 June 2011 – Awarded a People’s Choice Stevie Award in the Favorite New Computer Service category. 
 June 2011 – Named “Best Low-Cost Videoconferencing” by Inc. Magazine.

See also 

Videoconferencing
Collaborative software

References

External links 
 iMeet Web site

Teleconferencing
Videotelephony
VoIP software